The nubbinned fine-lined slider (Lerista colliveri)  is a species of skink, a lizard in the family Scincidae. The species is endemic to Queensland in Australia.

Etymology
The specific name, colliveri, is in honor of Frederick Stanley "Stan" Colliver (1908–1991), who was an Australian geologist and malacologist.

Habitat
The preferred natural habitats of L. colliveri are forest and savanna.

Description
It has very reduced limbs. Each rear leg has only one digit, which has a claw, but each front leg is only a clawless "nubbin".

Behavior
L. colliveri is terrestrial and fossorial.

Reproduction
L. colliveri is oviparous.

References

Further reading
Cogger HG (2014). Reptiles and Amphibians of Australia, Seventh Edition. Clayton, Victoria, Australia: CSIRO Publishing. xxx + 1,033 pp. .
Couper PJ, Ingram GJ (1992). "A new species of skink of Lerista from Queensland and a re-appraisal of L. allanae (Longman)". Memoirs of the Queensland Museum 32 (1): 55–60. (Lerista colliveri, new species).
Greer AE, Couper PJ (1998). "A further diagnostic character and some basic biological information for Lerista colliveri ". Mem. Queensland Mus. 42 (2): 474.
Wilson S, Swan G (2013). A Complete Guide to Reptiles of Australia, Fourth Edition. Sydney: New Holland Publishers. 522 pp. .

Lerista
Reptiles described in 1992
Taxa named by Patrick J. Couper
Taxa named by Glen Joseph Ingram